The 1970 Basque Pelota World Championships were the 6th edition of the Basque Pelota World Championships organized by  the FIPV.

Participating nations

Others

Events
A total of 12 events were disputed, in 4 playing areas.

Trinquete, 5 events disputed

Fronton (30 m), 2 events disputed

Fronton (36 m), 4 events disputed

Fronton (54 m), 1 event disputed

Medal table

References

World Championships,1970
1970 in European sport
Sport in San Sebastián
1970 in Spanish sport
September 1970 sports events in Europe
International sports competitions hosted by Spain
World Championships,1970
World Championships